The 2020 Davis Cup World Group I was held on 5–6 March 2021 and 17–19 September 2021. The eight highest-ranked winners of the World Group I ties automatically progressed to the 2022 Davis Cup Qualifying Round. The four lowest-ranked winners took part in an additional knock-out tie in November 2021, the two winners progressing to the 2022 Davis Cup Qualifying Round and the two losers contesting the 2022 Davis Cup World Group I play-offs. The losing nations from the World Group I ties will compete in the 2022 Davis Cup World Group I play-offs.

Teams
Twenty-four teams participated in the World Group I, in a series decided on a home and away basis. The seedings are based on the Nations Ranking of 9 March.

These twenty-four teams were:
 12 losing teams from Qualifying round:
 12 winning teams from World Group I Play-offs:

The eight highest-ranked (as at 20 September 2021) winners of the World Group I ties automatically progressed to the 2022 qualifiers. The four lowest-ranked winners took part in an additional knock-out tie in November 2021, with the two winners progressing to the 2022 Qualifiers and two losers contesting the 2022 World Group I Play-offs. The losing nations from the World Group I ties will compete in the World Group I Play-offs in 2022.

''#: Nations Ranking as of 9 March 2020.

Seeded teams
  (#4)
  (#16)
  (#19)
  (#20)
  (#21)
  (#22)
  (#25)
  (#26)
  (#27)
  (#28)
  (#29)
  (#30)

Unseeded teams
  (#31)
  (#32)
  (#33)
  (#34)
  (#35)
  (#36)
  (#37)
  (#38)
  (#40)
  (#41)
  (#42)
  (#45)

Results summary

World Group I results

Bolivia vs. Belgium

Argentina vs. Belarus

Pakistan vs. Japan

Uruguay vs. Netherlands

Slovakia vs. Chile

Finland vs. India

Norway vs. Uzbekistan

Lebanon vs. Brazil

New Zealand vs. South Korea

Romania vs. Portugal

Peru vs. Bosnia and Herzegovina

Ukraine vs. Israel

References

External links

World Group